Bernard Charlès (born 1957) is a French business executive. He is the chief executive officer and the Chairman of the board of directors of Dassault Systèmes, "the 3DEXPERIENCE Company", world leader  in 3D design software, 3D digital mock-up and Product Lifecycle Management (PLM) solutions. Charlès is the 13th best-performing CEO in the world according to the Harvard Business Review 2017 ranking. In 2018 Dassault Systèmes was named the most sustainable corporation in the world in the Global 100 Most Sustainable Corporations in the World index by Corporate Knights.  In 2018, he was named one of the "Best CEOs In The World" by the CEOWORLD magazine.

Early life and education

Bernard Charlès was born and grew up in Brittany, France.

He is a graduate from the Ecole Normale Supérieure engineering school in Cachan (ENS Cachan) and has a PhD in mechanical engineering majoring in automation engineering and information science. He also holds an agrégation — the most senior teaching qualification achievable in France (specializing in mechanical engineering).

Professional career

Bernard Charlès joined Dassault Systèmes in 1983 to develop new design technology – less than two years after the company was created. In 1986 he founded a New Technologies, Research and Strategy department. In 1988 he was named to the position of President of Strategy, Research & Development.

In 1989, he initiated the creation of the digital mock-up  (DMU), complete virtual 3D model of a product that replaced physical prototypes.

Charlès was appointed president and chief executive officer of Dassault Systèmes in September 1995. In 1996, he became a member of the board of directors. The same year he organized the flotation of Dassault Systèmes on the stock market.

In 2000, with the idea of Product Lifecycle Management (PLM), he extended the concept of the digital mock-up to the entire lifecycle of a product. In parallel he made a series of acquisitions and brand creation: ENOVIA in 1998, DELMIA in 2000 and SIMULIA in 2005.
To reinforce the company's business scope and sales capabilities, he decided to acquire SolidWorks in 1997, and to gain control of Dassault Systèmes’ entire distribution network, previously managed by IBM.

In 2012, with 3DEXPERIENCE, Charlès announced a new vision for the company based on the idea that 3D should also include the simulation of the consumer experience. He set a specific purpose to “The 3DEXPERIENCE Company”: “Dassault Systèmes provides business and people with 3DEXPERIENCE universes to imagine sustainable innovations capable of harmonizing product, nature and life.”

To support this ambition, he carried on an acquisition (Gemcom in 2012, Apriso in 2013, RTT, Quintiq and Accelrys in 2014) and diversification strategy with 3DSWYM for social innovation, EXALEAD and NETVIBES for data intelligence, GEOVIA in the Natural Resources sector, 3DVIA for a B2C approach, BIOVIA for virtual biosphere and materials, and 3DEXCITE for real-time, high-end visualizations.

In May 2016, he was named vice-president of the board of directors of Dassault Systèmes, of which he had become member in 1993.

Since May 2015, Bernard Charlès has been co-leading the French government project “Industry of the Future”. This alliance is a group of technology companies, professional associations and academic partners whose mission is to promote the French government's program to digitally transform industry in France.

He is the Honorary Chairman of La Fondation Dassault Systèmes that helps research and academic institutions leverage the power of 3D virtual worlds to stretch the limits of knowledge.

Charlès was elected a member of the National Academy of Engineering in 2017 for leadership in providing major software tools for simulation-based engineering.

Honors

Bernard Charlès holds the knight of Commander in the French Legion of Honour and is a member of the National Academy of Technologies of France. He is a foreign member of the US National Academy of Engineering.

References

External links
 Biography
 Dassault’s modest proposal: Change the way we make everything,  January 25, 2016
 Rethink Innovation! We are in the Experience Economy, Keynote lecture at CeBIT Global Conferences, March 16, 2015
 The Experience Economy is Changing Everything about the Way We Do Business, Executive Insight, Prime Magazine, Autumn 2014
 Inside a Beating Silicon Heart, Forbes, January 20, 2014
 Dassault Systèmes: a Story of Excellence, Interview with TV5Monde channel for the reception of the French Excellence prize, Subtitled in English, 2012
 View from the Top: Bernard Charles, president and CEO of Dassault Systèmes, Financial Times, May 8, 2009
 Spotlight: A Frenchman with virtual passion, The New York Times, January 6, 2006

French businesspeople
Living people
Dassault Group
1957 births